The Cross–Niger transition forests are a tropical moist broadleaf forest ecoregion of southeastern Nigeria, located between the Niger River on the west and the Cross River on the east. Once a rich mixture of tropical forest and savanna woodland covered these low, rolling hills but today this is one of the most densely populated areas of Africa and today most of the forest has been removed and the area is now grassland.

Location and description
The Niger River separates the Cross–Niger transition forests from the Nigerian lowland forests to the west, which probably resembles most closely the original environment of the Cross–Niger ecoregion. To the south and south-west lies the  Niger Delta swamp forests. To the north, the Cross–Niger transition forests yield to the Guinean forest-savanna mosaic of the drier interior. 

The climate is wet, becoming drier further inland, with a dry season from December to February.

Flora
The traditional flora and fauna of the ecoregion is "transitional", blending elements from the Upper Guinean forests of West Africa and the Lower Guinean-Congolian forests of Central Africa, which constitute the largest blocks of tropical moist forest on the African continent. Trees in the area include Afzelia, which is cultivated for timber, and the Borassus aethiopum palm.

Fauna
Small areas of protected forest do remain within the grassland and these are home to animals such as Sclater's guenon and crested chameleon (Trioceros cristatus). The Niger River has always been a substantial barrier to movement of wildlife in and out of the region. Large mammals have been depleted in the area since the 1940s and there is now so little wildlife remaining in the area that even bats and frogs are now trapped and eaten.

Threats
The ecoregion has sustained a dense human population for centuries, and much of the original forest cover has been cleared for agriculture, forest plantations, and urban developments such as the oil refineries of Port Harcourt. The few remaining enclaves of native forest include the Stubbs Creek Forest Reserve in Akwa Ibom together with some enclaves of sacred forest, which are continually disappearing as village life is eroded, and patches of riverine forest. There are forest reserves in Anambra and elsewhere but these last are mostly for the purpose of cultivating timber rather than preserving the original environment.

References

External links

Afrotropical ecoregions
Tropical and subtropical moist broadleaf forests
Geography of Nigeria
Cross River (Nigeria)
Niger River
Ecoregions of Nigeria